James Lee Howell (September 27, 1914 – January 4, 1995) was an American football player and coach for the National Football League (NFL)'s New York Giants.  Howell was born in Arkansas, and played college football and basketball at the University of Arkansas.

Playing career
He was drafted by the Giants in the 1937 NFL Draft, and played wide receiver and defensive back from 1937 to 1947.  While playing for the Giants, he was elected to the Arkansas House of Representatives to represent Lonoke County in 1940 and served one term during the January to March 1941 session of the legislature.

Coaching career
After his playing career ended, he was head coach for Wagner College football.

Howell returned to the Giants in 1954 as head coach, succeeding fan, media, and player favorite Steve Owen.  Howell quickly hired Vince Lombardi as his offensive coordinator and shortly after converted Tom Landry from player to defensive coordinator.  From 1954 to 1960, the Giants played in three NFL Championship Games, defeating George Halas's Chicago Bears in 1956 by the score of 47–7.

During Howell's seven seasons as head coach, he earned a career 53–27–4 record, with a .663 winning percentage.  He drafted and coached a roster of stars, including six future Pro Football Hall of Famers, Sam Huff, Andy Robustelli, Rosey Brown, Emlen Tunnell, Frank Gifford, and Don Maynard.  Although his conservative, defense-oriented style was unpopular with the fans and media, the Giants' success on the field was more satisfying.  Several other players from this era went on to become head coaches and broadcasters. His winning percentage of .663 is 12th alltime in NFL history.

Howell played and coached in an era when football went from a relatively simple game, to one of great complexity with schemes, formations, and playbooks designed to deceive as much as over power.  With future Hall of Famers Lombardi and Landry as coordinators, Howell's job was frequently to play the diplomat within his own team.

After football
Howell stayed with the team as Director of Player Personnel until his retirement in 1981. He died on January 4, 1995, in Lonoke, Arkansas.

The Professional Football Researchers Association named Howell to the PRFA Hall of Very Good Class of 2007 

Howell appeared on the April 30, 1957, episode of To Tell The Truth posing as a Texas Ranger.

Head coaching record

College

NFL

See also
 History of the New York Giants (1925–1978)

References

External links

1914 births
1995 deaths
20th-century American politicians
American football ends
Arkansas Razorbacks football players
Arkansas Razorbacks men's basketball players
New York Giants players
New York Giants head coaches
Democratic Party members of the Arkansas House of Representatives
Wagner Seahawks football coaches
People from Lonoke, Arkansas
Players of American football from Arkansas
American men's basketball players